Europagymnasium Auhof is a public school for the grades 5 to 12, preparing Students for University, located in Linz, Upper Austria.
It has three branches, a science branch, a French branch and an English taught branch.

Famous alumnae
Alexander Falk in 1985

External links
Website (German)
Website (German)

Schools in Linz